Nathalie Brugger (born 25 December 1985 in Lausanne) is a Swiss sailor. She competed in the Laser Radial class event at the 2008 Summer Olympics, finishing in 6th, and the 2012 Summer Olympics, where she placed 14th.

References

1985 births
Living people
Olympic sailors of Switzerland
Swiss female sailors (sport)
Sailors at the 2008 Summer Olympics – Laser Radial
Sailors at the 2012 Summer Olympics – Laser Radial
Sportspeople from Lausanne
Sailors at the 2016 Summer Olympics – Nacra 17
Swiss sportswomen